
Gmina Jasionówka is a rural gmina (administrative district) in Mońki County, Podlaskie Voivodeship, in north-eastern Poland.

Villages
Gmina Jasionówka contains the villages and settlements of Brzozówka Folwarczna, Czarnystok, Dobrzyniówka, Górnystok, Jasionóweczka, Jasionówka, Kalinówka Królewska, Kamionka, Kąty, Koziniec, Krasne Folwarczne, Krasne Małe, Krasne Stare, Krzywa, Kujbiedy, Łękobudy, Milewskie and Słomianka.

Neighbouring gminas
Gmina Jasionówka is bordered by the gminas of Czarna Białostocka, Jaświły, Knyszyn and Korycin.

References
Polish official population figures 2006

Jasionowka
Mońki County